Lorraine Grillo (born November 17, 1949) is an American government official who served as the first deputy mayor of New York City in the administration of Mayor Eric Adams. Grillo served as senior advisor to Mayor Bill de Blasio for COVID recovery and commissioner of the New York City Department of Design and Construction.

Career 
Grillo is from Astoria, Queens. She began her career as community relations specialist for the New York City School Construction Authority. Grillo later served in several senior roles in the department before being appointed as CEO and president in 2014. On July 16, 2018, she was appointed commissioner of the New York City Department of Design and Construction. In December 2021, Mayor-elect Eric Adams announced that he had selected Grillo to serve as first deputy mayor. She assumed office in January 2022. Grillo succeeds deputy mayor Dean Fuleihan.

References 

Living people
Deputy mayors of New York City
People from Astoria, Queens
Politicians from Queens, New York
21st-century American women politicians
Women in New York (state) politics
1949 births
21st-century American politicians